Luynes may refer to:

Places in France
 Luynes, Bouches-du-Rhône
 Luynes, Indre-et-Loire

Other uses
 Duke of Luynes, a title belonging to the noble French house d'Albert de Luynes, including a list of people with the surname (d'Albert) de Luynes
 Luynes river, a tributary to the river Arc in the French Provence